The 509th Security Forces Squadron is a United States Air Force Security Forces squadron at Whiteman Air Force Base. The squadron contains nearly 600 security police total. The manning is vital to the protection of Whiteman AFB's B-2 Spirit aircraft.

History

References

Military units and formations in Missouri
Security Forces 0509